Christopher Bates is a Canadian menswear designer based in Milan, Italy.

Biography
Born and raised in Vancouver, British Columbia, Bates completed a Bachelor of Arts program at the University of British Columbia and went on to complete a Management Certificate in Marketing Communications at British Columbia Institute of Technology. After working in the Vancouver marketing industry for five years he moved to Milan to study Fashion Design at Istituto Marangoni. After graduating he founded the Christopher Bates brand in Canada in 2008, and has since relocated to Milan where he designs and oversees management operations.

Brand
The personality and aesthetic of the Christopher Bates brand has been recognized for its contemporary European tailoring and bespoke details. A recurring signature style in his collections is the 'Romeo' dress shirt which features a kiss print on the collar. The brand has seen partnerships with Holt Renfrew, Gotstyle, Gilt, and collaborative projects with Browns and Air Canada.

Notable clients
His clothing has been worn by Greg Bryk, Kristopher Higgins, Ramin Karimloo, John Boyega, Jordan Weller, Charlie Carrick, Tygh Runyan, Alex Di Giorgio, Craig Olejnik, Gennaro Laccarino, and Ron MacLean.

Awards
2012 Mercedes-Benz StartUp Program Feature Designer

2014 Included as one of Canada's Top 100 Most Influential People

2014  Notable Award for Fashion in Canada

2015 CAFA Menswear Designer of the Year Award Nomination

References

Year of birth missing (living people)
Living people
British Columbia Institute of Technology alumni
Canadian fashion designers
Menswear designers
People from Vancouver
University of British Columbia alumni